The Davie Baronetcy, of Creedy in the County of Devon, was a title in the Baronetage of England. It was created on 9 September 1641 for John Davie, the Member of Parliament for Tiverton in 1621–22.

Davie baronets, of Creedy (1641)

 Sir John Davie, 1st Baronet (–1654) MP for Tiverton 1621–22
 Sir John Davie, 2nd Baronet (1612–1678), son, MP for Tavistock 1661, Sheriff of Devon in 1671.
 Sir John Davie, 3rd Baronet (1660–1692), nephew, MP for Saltash 1679–85, Sheriff of Devon in 1688, died unmarried.
 Sir William Davie, 4th Baronet (1662–1707), younger brother
 Sir John Davie, 5th Baronet (died 1727), first cousin
 Sir John Davie, 6th Baronet (1700–1737), son
 Sir John Davie, 7th Baronet (1734–1792), son
 Sir John Davie, 8th Baronet (1772–1803), son
 Sir John Davie, 9th Baronet (1798–1824), son
 Sir Humphrey Phineas Davie, 10th Baronet (1775–1846), uncle. Baronetcy extinct on his death.

See also
Ferguson-Davie baronets

References

External links

Extinct baronetcies in the Baronetage of England